B21 comprises brothers Bally and Bhota Jagpal. The duo — originally a trio with Jassi Sidhu, who left the band in 2002 — take their name from the Handsworth postcode in Birmingham, England.

Discography

"Darshan", which was featured in Bend It Like Beckham and included on the film's soundtrack album and on the album Made in England.

Solo albums by Bally Jagpal

Awards
2014 Brit Asia TV Music Awards (Birmingham)
 Best Album for 12B
2003 UK Asian Music Awards (London)
Best Band B21 (Bhota Jagpal & Bally Jagpal)
2000 Asian Pop Awards (Birmingham)
Best Selling Album Dark & Dangerous (Bally Jagpal)
Best Song Aja Soneya (Bally Jagpal)
1999 Toor Films International Awards
Best Music Producer Bally Jagpal
1998 Movie Box Records (Birmingham)
Exceeding Sales Of 25,000 B21
1998 Movie Pageant Awards (London)
Best Newcomers B21
Best Selling Album Live and Direct (Bally Jagpal)
1998 Student Poll Awards (Leicester)
Best Newcomers B21
Best Album B21
1998 Pop Awards (Birmingham)
Best Newcomers B21
Best Up-coming B21
Best Song Bally Jagpal ("Nakhre Bin Soni Temi")

References

External links
Official website

Bhangra (music) musical groups
Punjabi musical groups
Musical groups from Birmingham, West Midlands
English Sikhs
People from Jalandhar
Musical groups established in 1996
Sibling musical duos
English musical duos